The Spanish missions in the Sonoran Desert are a series of Jesuit Catholic religious outposts established by the Spanish Catholic Jesuits and other orders for religious conversions of the Pima and Tohono O'odham indigenous peoples residing in the Sonoran Desert. An added goal was giving Spain a colonial presence in their frontier territory of the Sonora y Sinaloa Province in the Viceroyalty of New Spain, and relocating  by Indian Reductions (Reducciones de Indios) settlements and encomiendas for agricultural, ranching, and mining labor.

Geography and history

The missions are in an area of the Sonoran Desert, then called "Pimería Alta de Sonora y Sinaloa" (Upper Pima  of Sonora and Sinaloa), now divided between the Mexican state of Sonora and the U.S. state of Arizona. Jesuits in missions in Northwestern Mexico wrote reports that throw light on the indigenous peoples they evangelized. A 1601 report, Relación de la Provincia de Nuestra Señora de Sinaloa was published in 1945. An important Jesuit report concerned the resistance in 1691 of the Tarahumara to evangelization, Historia de la tercera rebelión tarahumara. Another important Jesuit account of evangelization in Sonora is Estado y descripción de Sonora, 1730, which has considerable information about the size of the indigenous population, culture, and languages.

In the Spring of 1687, Jesuit missionary named Father Eusebio Francisco Kino lived and worked with the Native Americans (including the Sobaipuri) in the area called the "Pimería Alta," or "Upper Pima Country,"  which presently is located in northern Sonora and southern Arizona. During Father Eusebio Kino's stay in the Pimería Alta, he founded over twenty missions in eight mission districts.

On February 3, 1768, King Carlos III ordered the expulsion of the Jesuits from Spain and its overseas empire.  Despite the order, many Jesuits remained in and around the present day Tucson, Arizona as late as the 1780s.

Missions

See also
On Spanish Missions in neighboring regions:
 Spanish missions in Arizona (including northern Arizona)
 Spanish missions in Baja California
 Spanish missions in California
 Spanish missions in Chihuahua and Coahuila
 Spanish missions in New Mexico

On general missionary history:
 Catholic Church and the Age of Discovery
 List of the oldest churches in Mexico

On colonial Spanish American history:
 Spanish colonization of the Americas
 California mission clash of cultures

References

Further reading
Burrus, E. J., 1965, Kino and the Cartography of Northwestern New Spain. Tucson, AZ:  Arizona Pioneers' Historical Society.
Burrus, E. J., 1971, Kino and Manje: Explorers of Sonora and Arizona. In Sources and Studies for the History of the Americas, Vol. 10. Rome and St. Louis: Jesuit Historical Institute.
Di Peso, Charles, 1953, The Sobaipuri Indians of the Upper San Pedro River Valley, Southwestern  Arizona. Dragoon, AZ: Amerind Foundation Publication No. 6.
Di Peso, Charles, 1956, The Upper Pima of San Cayetano del Tumacacori:  An Archaeohistorical Reconstruction of the Ootam of Pimeria Alta. The Amerind Foundation, Inc. Dragoon, Arizona.
Karns, H. J., 1954, Luz de Tierra Incognita. Tucson, AZ: Arizona Silhouettes.
Kessell, John L., 1970, Mission of Sorrow: Jesuit Guevavi and the Pimas, 1691-1767.  Tucson, AZ: University of Arizona Press.
Masse, W. Bruce, 1981, A Reappraisal of the Protohistoric Sobaipuri Indians of Southeastern Arizona. In The Protohistoric Period in the North American Southwest, A.D. 1450-1700. David R. Wilcox and W. Bruce Masse, editors. Tempe, AZ: Arizona State University Anthropological Research Papers No. 24, pp. 28–56.
McIntyre, Allan J., 2008, The Tohono O'odham and Pimeria Alta. Charleston, SC: Arcadia Publishing.
Officer, James E., Mardith Schuetz, and Bernard Fontana (editors), 1996, The Pimeria Alta: Missions & More. Tucson, AZ: The Southwestern Research Center.
Pickens, Buford L., 1993, The Missions of Northern Sonora, A 1935 Field Documentation. Tucson, AZ: University of Arizona Press.
Robinson, William J., 1976, Mission Guevavi: Excavations in the Convento. The Kiva 42(2):135-175.
Seymour, Deni J., 1989, The Dynamics of Sobaipuri Settlement in the Eastern Pimeria Alta.  Journal of the Southwest 31(2):205-222.
Seymour, Deni J., 1990, Sobaipuri-Pima Settlement Along the Upper San Pedro River: A Thematic Survey Between Fairbank and Aravaipa Canyon. Report for the Bureau of Land Management.
Seymour, Deni J., 1993, Piman Settlement Survey in the Middle Santa Cruz River Valley, Santa Cruz County, Arizona. Report submitted to Arizona State Parks in fulfillment of survey and planning grant contract requirements.
Seymour, Deni J., 1993, In Search of the Sobaipuri Pima: Archaeology of the Plain and Subtle. Archaeology in Tucson. Newsletter of the Center for Desert Archaeology. 7(1):1-4.
Seymour, Deni J., 1997, Finding History in the Archaeological Record: The Upper Piman Settlement of Guevavi. Kiva 62(3):245-260.
Seymour, Deni J., 2003, Sobaipuri-Pima Occupation in the Upper San Pedro Valley: San Pablo de Quiburi. New Mexico Historical Review 78(2):147-166.
Seymour, Deni J., 2007, A Syndetic Approach to Identification of the Historic Mission Site of San Cayetano Del Tumacácori. International Journal of Historical Archaeology, 11(3):269-296.
Seymour, Deni J., 2007, Delicate Diplomacy on a Restless Frontier: Seventeenth-Century Sobaipuri Social And Economic Relations in Northwestern New Spain, Part I. New Mexico Historical Review, 82(4).
Seymour, Deni J., 2008, Delicate Diplomacy on a Restless Frontier: Seventeenth-Century Sobaipuri Social And Economic Relations in Northwestern New Spain, Part II. New Mexico Historical Review, 83(2).
Seymour, Deni J., 2008, Father Kino’s 'Neat Little House and Church' at Guevavi. Journal of the Southwest 50(4)(Winter).

External links
 Kino Missions, US National Park Service
 Arizona Education, Kino Missions
In the Footsteps of a Bold Priest, New York Times
 Bibliography, Kino Missions

 
 
History of indigenous peoples of North America
Jesuit history in North America
New Spain
Sonoran Desert